The Maysville Historic District in Maysville, Georgia is a  historic district which was listed on the National Register of Historic Places in 1985.

It runs along E. Main, W. Main and Homer Streets, and included 194 contributing buildings and one contributing site.

It includes Greek Revival, Late Victorian, and Eclectic architecture.

It spans Banks and Jackson counties.

References

Historic districts on the National Register of Historic Places in Georgia (U.S. state)
National Register of Historic Places in Banks County, Georgia
National Register of Historic Places in Jackson County, Georgia
Greek Revival architecture in Georgia (U.S. state)
Victorian architecture in Georgia (U.S. state)